Nico Lazaridis (born 16 October 1952) is a former professional German footballer.

Lazaridis made three appearances in the 2. Fußball-Bundesliga for Tennis Borussia Berlin during his playing career. He made his debut 10 days after his 18th birthday on 26 October 1979 and thereby became the youngest ever 2. Bundesliga player at the time.

References

External links 
 

1962 births
Living people
German people of Greek descent
German footballers
Association football midfielders
2. Bundesliga players
Tennis Borussia Berlin players